Gaḷḷegos is one of 15 parishes (administrative divisions) in Mieres, a municipality within the province and autonomous community of Asturias, in northern Spain.

Towns 
 Canga Fondera
 Canga Cimera
 Cenera
 Los Fornieḷḷos
 Foz
 Gaḷḷegos
 Vistrimir
 Viḷḷar
 La Fariega
 Ḷḷandegustio

References 

Parishes in Mieres